Calyptomyrmex singalensis, is a species of ant in the subfamily Myrmicinae, which can be found in Sri Lanka.

References

External links

 at antwiki.org
Itis.gov
Animaldiversity.org

Myrmicinae
Hymenoptera of Asia
Insects described in 1912